Roger H. Mills (April 18, 1813 – November 12, 1881) was an American politician and lawyer.

Born in New Hartford, Connecticut, son of Roger and Harriet Merrill Mills, Roger Henry Mills went to Yale Law School and was admitted to the Connecticut bar. He practiced law in New Hartford, Connecticut. Mills served in the Connecticut House of Representatives in 1839 and 1840. In 1848, Mills served in the Connecticut State Senate and was a Whig. In 1849, he was elected Secretary of State of Connecticut. He was also probate judge. He later became a Republican. In 1853, Mills moved to Beloit, Wisconsin and continued to practice law. Mills served as mayor of Beloit, Wisconsin. Mills died in Beloit, Wisconsin.

Notes

1813 births
1881 deaths
People from New Hartford, Connecticut
Politicians from Beloit, Wisconsin
Yale Law School alumni
Connecticut lawyers
Wisconsin lawyers
Connecticut Whigs
19th-century American politicians
Connecticut Republicans
Connecticut state court judges
Members of the Connecticut House of Representatives
Connecticut state senators
Secretaries of the State of Connecticut
Mayors of places in Wisconsin
19th-century American judges
19th-century American lawyers